The 2001–02 Welsh Alliance League is the 18th season of the Welsh Alliance League, which is in the third level of the Welsh football pyramid.

The league consists of thirteen teams and concluded with Amlwch Town as champions and promoted to the Cymru Alliance.

Teams
Llanfairpwll were champions in the previous season and were promoted to the Cymru Alliance.

Abergele Town and Colwyn Bay YMCA were replaced by Gwynedd League champions, Y Felinheli and Clwyd League champions, Rhydymwyn.

Grounds and locations

League table

References

External links
Welsh Alliance League

Welsh Alliance League seasons
3
Wales